Hexokinase domain containing 1 (HKDC1) is an enzyme which in humans is encoded by the HKDC1 gene on chromosome 10. It is a recently discovered hexokinase isoform that likely phosphorylates glucose in maternal metabolism during pregnancy.

Structure
The HKDC1 gene is oriented in a head-to-tail arrangement next to the HK1 gene on chromosome 10. This arrangement, along with its amino acid sequence similarity to HK1, suggests that HKDC1 and HK1 derived from the same precursor via a tandem gene duplication event. The similarity between HKDC1 and HK1 may have obscured its discovery in earlier screens for vertebrate hexokinases. Unlike the HK2 pseudogene, HKDC1 contains an intact open reading frame of 917 residues and is conserved across animal species, indicating that it encodes a functional protein. Moreover, the encoded protein contains conserved glucose-binding sites in its N- and C-terminal domains as well as an ATP-binding site in its C-terminal domain, indicating that its C-terminal is capable of hexokinase activity.

Function 
As the recently identified fifth isoform of hexokinase, HKDC1 catalyzes the rate-limiting and first obligatory step of glucose metabolism, which is the ATP-dependent phosphorylation of glucose to G6P. Though its particular biological function remains unclear, HKDC1 has been suggested to play a more major role in glucose metabolism during pregnancy, as the mother would need to provide enough energy for both herself and the fetus. HKDC1 is ubiquitously expressed, with the highest levels of expression in pharynx, thymus, colon, esophagus, and eye tissue.

Clinical Significance

Cancer
Compared to the other hexokinases, HKDC1 was dramatically overexpressed in cancer tissues, indicating that this isoform might play an important and different role in cancer growth. Further experiments clarifying this role will be required for developing HKDC1 as a therapeutic target.

Gestational hyperglycemia
Several regulatory variants, including various enhancers, targeting HKDC1 expression have been associated with gestational hyperglycemia in pregnant women. Considering that maternal glucose levels during pregnancy impact both the fetal and later health outcomes, a greater understanding of the genetic mechanisms underlying  maternal glycemia during pregnancy may help identify and aid such women at risk.

See also 
Hexokinase
HK1
HK2
HK3
Glucokinase

References 

Enzymes